The list below shows the leading Thoroughbred sire of racehorses in France for each year since 1887. This is determined by the amount of prize money won by the sire's progeny during the season. Due to the huge prize money of the Prix de l'Arc de Triomphe, the sire of the winner of that race typically wins the title of the Leading Sire in France.

 1887 - Hermit (1)
 1888 - Le Destrier (1)
 1889 - Saxifrage (1)
 1890 - Atlantic (1)
 1891 - Energy (1)
 1892 - Energy (2)
 1893 - Perplexe (1)
 1894 - The Bard (1)
 1895 - Le Sancy (1)
 1896 - Clover (1)
 1897 - Le Sancy (2)
 1898 - Cambyse (1)
 1899 - War Dance (1)
 1900 - Le Sancy (3)
 1901 - The Bard (2)
 1902 - Omnium II (1)
 1903 - Le Sancy (4)
 1904 - Flying Fox (1)
 1905 - Flying Fox (2)
 1906 - Le Sagittaire (1)
 1907 - Perth (1)
 1908 - Perth (2)
 1909 - Rabelais (1)
 1910 - Simonian (1)
 1911 - Perth (3)
 1912 - Simonian (2)
 1913 - Flying Fox (3)
 1914 - Prestige (1)
 1915 -
 1916 - Sans Souci (1)
 1917 - Maintenon (1)
 1918 -
 1919 - Rabelais (2)
 1920 - Alcantara (1)
 1921 - Bruleur (1)
 1922 - Sardanapale (1)
 1923 - Teddy (1)
 1924 - Bruleur (2)
 1925 - Sans Souci (2)
 1926 - Rabelais (3)
 1927 - Sardanapale (2)
 1928 - Alcantara (2)
 1929 - Bruleur (3)
 1930 - Kircubbin (1)

 1931 - Ksar (1)
 1932 - Massine (1)
 1933 - Apelle (1)
 1934 - Astérus (1)
 1935 - Blandford (1)
 1936 - Fiterari (1)
 1937 - Mon Talisman (1)
 1938 - Bubbles (1)
 1939 - Pharos (1)
 1940 - Tourbillon (1)
 1941 - Biribi (1)
 1942 - Tourbillon (2)
 1943 - Pinceau (1)
 1944 - Pharis (1)
 1945 - Tourbillon (3)
 1946 - Prince Rose (1)
 1947 - Goya II (1)
 1948 - Goya II (2)
 1949 - Djebel (1)
 1950 - Deux Pour Cent (1)
 1951 - Prince Bio (1)
 1952 - Fair Copy (1)
 1953 - Sayani (1)
 1954 - Sunny Boy (1)
 1955 - Admiral Drake (1)
 1956 - Djebel (2)
 1957 - Tifinar (1)
 1958 - Vieux Manoir (1)
 1959 - Vandale (1)
 1960 - Prince Chevalier (1)
 1961 - Wild Risk (1)
 1962 - Tantieme (1)
 1963 - Le Haar (1)
 1964 - Wild Risk (2)
 1965 - Tantieme (2)
 1966 - Sicambre (1)
 1967 - Prince Taj (1)
 1968 - Prince Taj (2)
 1969 - Snob (1)
 1970 - Sheshoon (1)
 1971 - Traffic (1)
 1972 - Sanctus (1)
 1973 - Val de Loir (1)
 1974 - Val de Loir (2)

 1975 - Val de Loir (3)
 1976 - Luthier (1)
 1977 - Caro (1)
 1978 - Lyphard (1)
 1979 - Lyphard (2)
 1980 - Riverman (1)
 1981 - Riverman (2)
 1982 - Luthier (2)
 1983 - Luthier (3)
 1984 - Luthier (4)
 1985 - Crystal Palace (1)
 1986 - Arctic Tern (1)
 1987 - Nureyev (1)
 1988 - Kenmare (1)
 1989 - Kenmare (2)
 1990 - Saint Cyrien (1)
 1991 - Green Dancer (1)
 1992 - Fabulous Dancer (1)
 1993 - Sadler's Wells (1)
 1994 - Sadler's Wells (2)
 1995 - Highest Honor (1)
 1996 - Fairy King (1)
 1997 - Nureyev (1)
 1998 - Linamix (1)
 1999 - Sadler's Wells (3)
 2000 - Highest Honor (2)
 2001 - Danehill (1)
 2002 - Highest Honor (3)
 2003 - Darshaan (1)
 2004 - Linamix (2)
 2005 - Montjeu (1)
 2006 - Dansili (1)
 2007 - Danehill (2)
 2008 - Zamindar (1)
 2009 - Cape Cross (1)
 2010 - King's Best (1)
 2011 - Lomitas (1)
 2012 - Poliglote (1)
 2013 - Motivator (1)
 2014 - Dansili (2)
 2015 - Dubawi (1)
 2016 - Galileo (1)
 2017 - Nathaniel (1)
 2018 - Nathaniel (2)
 2019 - Galileo (2)
 2020 - Siyouni (1)
 2021 - Siyouni (2)
 2022 - Frankel (1)

References
 tbheritage.com

See also
 Leading sire in Australia
 Leading sire in Germany
 Leading sire in Great Britain & Ireland
 Leading sire in Japan
 Leading broodmare sire in Japan
 Leading sire in North America
 Leading broodmare sire in Great Britain & Ireland
 Leading broodmare sire in North America

Horse racing in France